1954 in sports describes the year's events in world sport.

American football
 NFL Championship: the Cleveland Browns won 56–10 over the Detroit Lions at Cleveland Stadium
 Orange Bowl (1953 season):
 The Maryland Terrapins lose 7–0 to the Oklahoma Sooners; still voted national champions by the AP and Coaches Poll

Artistic gymnastics
 1954 World Championships
 Men's all-around champion – Viktor Chukarin, USSR
 Women's all-around champion – Galina Rud'ko, USSR
 Team competition champions – men's – USSR; women's – USSR

Association football
FIFA World Cup
 1954 World Cup held in Switzerland. West Germany beat Hungary 3–2.
England
 First Division – Wolverhampton Wanderers win the 1953–54 title.
 FA Cup – West Bromwich Albion beat Preston North End 3–2.
Spain
 La Liga won by Real Madrid
Italy
 Serie A won by F.C. Internazionale Milano
West Germany
 German football championship won by Hannover 96
France
 French Division 1 won by Lille OSC
Portugal
 Primeira Liga won by Sporting C.P.
Other events
 May 8 – The Asian Football Confederation is founded in Manila.
 June 15 – UEFA is founded in Basel.

Athletics
 May 6 – Roger Bannister breaks the four-minute mile barrier with a time of 3:59.4
 August 25 to 29 August – European Championships held at Berne, capital of Switzerland

Australian rules football
Victorian Football League
 5 June: Champion Essendon full-forward John Coleman has his career ended by a serious knee injury
 Footscray wins the 58th VFL Premiership by defeating Melbourne 15.12 (102) to 7.9 (51) in the Grand Final.
 Brownlow Medal awarded to Roy Wright (Richmond)
South Australian National Football League
 Port Adelaide begins a record run of six consecutive SANFL premierships by beating West Adelaide 11.13 (79) to 10.16 (76) in a highly controversial Grand Final.
 Magarey Medal won by Len Fitzgerald (Sturt)
West Australian National Football League
  wins its third successive premiership and eighth overall beating  21.14 (140) to 9.8 (62).
 Sandover Medal awarded to Merv McIntosh (Perth)

Baseball
 January 14 – Former Yankees great Joe DiMaggio marries actress Marilyn Monroe in a union of heavily publicized media stars.
 St. Louis Browns move to Baltimore, Maryland, becoming the new Baltimore Orioles.
 World Series – New York Giants win 4 games to 0 over the Cleveland Indians

Basketball
 FIBA World Championship –
 Gold: United States
 Silver: Brazil
 Bronze: Philippines
 NCAA Men's Basketball Championship –
La Salle wins 92–76 over Bradley
 NBA Finals –
 Minneapolis Lakers win 4–3 over the Syracuse Nationals
 March 13 – Milan High School, enrollment 161, defeated Muncie Central High School (enrollment over 1,600) 32–30 to win the Indiana state title. The 1986 movie classic Hoosiers was very loosely based on the story of this Milan team.

Boxing
 September 17 in New York City, Rocky Marciano retained his World Heavyweight title with an 8th-round knockout of Ezzard Charles
 December 12 – death of Ed Sanders (24), American heavyweight soon after a fight with Willie James in which he lost consciousness

Canadian football
 The BC Lions started play in the Western Interprovincial Football Union as the ninth professional team.
 After the 1954 season, the Ontario Rugby Football Union stops challenging for the Grey Cup, permanently establishing that trophy as one to be awarded only to professional teams.
 These changes result in the Grey Cup being an East vs. West competition.  Although the Canadian Football League was not technically founded until 1958, 1954 is often referred to as the start of the "modern era" of Canadian professional football.  It is also considered to be the year the CFL was founded in substance if not in name.
 In the Grey Cup, the Edmonton Eskimos win 26–25 over the Montreal Alouettes.
 The Canadian Intermediate-Senior championship was awarded to the Winnipeg Rams. The team consisted of  Rich Kolisnyk (quarterback), Mel Kotch, Bob Jones, Tom Brisson, Bill Ritchie, Len Sigurdson, Walt Van Wynsberg, Lorne Miller, Gerry Duguid, Harry Makin, Art Makin, Jerry Lavitt, John Thorney, Bill Barrett, Jim Thorney, Al McBride, Bill Senyk, Bob Bouchard, Ray Charambura, Nick Miller, Dick Hebertson, Ron Stephenson, Al Passman, Mort Corrin, Bill Yee, Norm Lampe, Dede Brown, Joe Sawchuk, Art Brockhill, Lew Miles, Ken Freeman, Bill Thomas, Ron Cooke, Pete Sawchuk, Harry Snider, Harold Neufeld and their mascot Ken Kolisnyk.

Figure skating
 World Figure Skating Championships –
 Men's champion: Hayes Alan Jenkins, United States
 Ladies’ champion: Gundi Busch, Germany
 Pair skating champions: Frances Dafoe & Norris Bowden, Canada
 Ice dancing champions: Jean Westwood & Lawrence Demmy, Great Britain

Golf
Men's professional
 Masters Tournament – Sam Snead
 U.S. Open – Ed Furgol
 British Open – Peter Thomson
 PGA Championship – Chick Harbert
 PGA Tour money leader – Bob Toski – $65,820
Men's amateur
 British Amateur – Doug Bachli
 U.S. Amateur – Arnold Palmer
Women's professional
 Women's Western Open – Betty Jameson
 U.S. Women's Open – Babe Zaharias
 Titleholders Championship – Louise Suggs
 LPGA Tour money leader – Patty Berg – $16,011

Harness racing
 Little Brown Jug for pacers won by Adios Harry
 Hambletonian for trotters won by Newport Dream
 Australian Inter Dominion Harness Racing Championship –
 Pacers: Tennessee Sky

Horse racing
Steeplechases
 Cheltenham Gold Cup – Four Ten
 Grand National – Royal Tan
Hurdle races
 Champion Hurdle – Sir Ken
Flat races
 Australia – Melbourne Cup won by Rising Fast
 Canada – Queen's Plate won by Collisteo
 France – Prix de l'Arc de Triomphe won by Sica Boy
 Ireland – Irish Derby Stakes won by Zarathustra
 English Triple Crown Races:
 2,000 Guineas Stakes – Darius
 The Derby – Never Say Die
 St. Leger Stakes – Never Say Die
 United States Triple Crown Races:
 Kentucky Derby – Determine
 Preakness Stakes – Hasty Road
 Belmont Stakes – High Gun

Ice hockey
 Art Ross Trophy as the NHL's leading scorer during the regular season: Gordie Howe, Detroit Red Wings
 Hart Memorial Trophy for the NHL's Most Valuable Player: Al Rollins, Chicago Black Hawks
 Stanley Cup – Detroit Red Wings win 4 games to 3 over the Montreal Canadiens
 World Hockey Championship
 Men's champion: USSR wins 7–2 over Canada's East York Lyndhursts.
 NCAA Men's Ice Hockey Championship – Rensselaer Polytechnic Institute Engineers defeat University of Minnesota Golden Gophers 5–4 in overtime in Colorado Springs, Colorado

Motorsport

Rugby league
 May 5 – 1953–54 Challenge Cup Final replay is won 8–4 by Warrington against Halifax before a world record crowd for a rugby football match of either code of over 120,000 at Odsal Stadium.
 May 8 – 1953–54 Northern Rugby Football League season culminates in Warrington's 8–7 win over Halifax in the Championship Final at Maine Road before 36,519.
 September 18 – 1954 NSWRFL season culminates in South Sydney's 23–15 win over Newtown in the grand final at the Sydney Cricket Ground before a crowd of 45,759
 November 13 – first World Cup tournament culminates in Great Britain's 16 – 12 win over France in the final.
 December 13 – the final match of the 1953–54 European Championship was played, with England finishing on top of the tournament ladder to claim the championship.

Rugby union
 60th Five Nations Championship series is shared by England, France and Wales.  This is the first time that France either wins or shares the title.

Skiing
 FIS World Ski Championships –
Men's combined champion: Stein Eriksen, Norway
Women's combined champion: Ida Schöpfer, Switzerland

Snooker
 World Snooker Championship – Fred Davis beats Walter Donaldson 39-21

Tennis
Australia
 Australian Men's Singles Championship – Mervyn Rose (Australia) defeats Rex Hartwig (Australia) 6–2, 0–6, 6–4, 6–2
 Australian Women's Singles Championship – Thelma Coyne Long (Australia) defeats Jenny Staley Hoad (Australia) 6–3, 6–4
England
 Wimbledon Men's Singles Championship – Jaroslav Drobný (Egypt) defeats Ken Rosewall (Australia) 13–11, 4–6, 6–2, 9–7
 Wimbledon Women's Singles Championship – Maureen Connolly Brinker (USA) defeats Louise Brough Clapp (USA) 6–2, 7–5
France
 French Men's Singles Championship – Tony Trabert (USA) defeats Arthur Larsen (USA) 6–4, 7–5, 6–1
 French Women's Singles Championship – Maureen Connolly (USA) defeats Ginette Bucaille (France) 6–4, 6–1
USA
 American Men's Singles Championship – Vic Seixas (USA) defeats Rex Hartwig (Australia) 3–6, 6–2, 6–4, 6–4
 American Women's Singles Championship – Doris Hart (USA) defeats Louise Brough (USA) 6–8, 6–1, 8–6
Davis Cup
 1954 Davis Cup –  3–2  at White City Stadium (grass) Sydney, Australia

Multi-sport events
 Asian Games held in Manila, the Philippines
 Central American and Caribbean Games held in Mexico City, Mexico
 1954 British Empire and Commonwealth Games held in Vancouver, Canada

Awards
 Associated Press Male Athlete of the Year – Willie Mays, Major League Baseball
 Associated Press Female Athlete of the Year – Babe Didrikson Zaharias, LPGA golf

References

 
Sports by year